""Only One Love in My Life" is a song written by R.C. Bannon and John Bettis, and recorded by American country music artist Ronnie Milsap.  It was released in May 1978 as the first single and title track from the album Only One Love in My Life.  The song was Milsap's tenth number one on the country chart.  The single stayed at number one for three weeks and spent a total of 11 weeks on the country chart's top 40.

Chart performance

References
 

1978 singles
Ronnie Milsap songs
Songs written by R.C. Bannon
Songs with lyrics by John Bettis
Song recordings produced by Tom Collins (record producer)
RCA Records singles
1978 songs